Cerastium brachypetalum, commonly called gray chickweed, grey mouse-ear or gray mouse-ear chickweed, is a spring blooming annual plant species. It is native from Eurasia and introduced and naturalized in North America.

Cerastium brachypetalum is one of 101 species deemed high priorities for conservation in the UK by the wild flower and plant charity Plantlife.

References

Milne-Redhead E. "Cerastium brachypetalum Pers in Britain" The Naturalist July Sept 1947: 95-96

Horn Peter C. "Cerastium brachypetalum in decline in Bedfordshire" BSBI News 65 18:20 (1994)

Horn Peter C. "The Decline and Conservation of Cerastium brachypetalum in Bedfordshire"
The Bedfordshire Naturalist 48: 102 (1994)

Palmer J.R. "Cerastium brachypetalum - Status in West Kent" BSBI News 65: 21-22 (1994)

Horn Peter C. "Cerastium brachypetalum in a Bedfordshire Railway Cutting" BSBI News  
101 25-26 (2006)

brachypetalum
Taxa named by Christiaan Hendrik Persoon
Flora of Malta